Amenis is a Neotropical genus of firetips in the family Hesperiidae. The genus is monotypic containing a single species, Amenis pionia (Hewitson, 1857).

Subspecies
Amenis pionia pionia Colombia, Venezuela
Amenis pionia picia Evans, 1951 Colombia
Amenis pionia ponina (Herrich-Schäffer, 1869) Panama, Venezuela

References
Natural History Museum Lepidoptera genus database

External links
images representing Amenis pionia at Consortium for the Barcode of Life

Hesperiidae
Hesperiidae of South America
Hesperiidae genera
Monotypic butterfly genera